Alien Worlds is a British sci-fi nature docufiction narrated by Sophie Okonedo. The 4-part miniseries, depicted by using CGI techniques, blends fact with science fiction and conceptualizes what alien life might be like by applying the laws of life on Earth to imagined exoplanets. The series was released on Netflix on 2 December 2020.

Episodes

Reception 

The weekend after the series' release, it was one of Netflix's top 10 shows in the UK.

Sheena Scott of Forbes called the series "entertaining and very informative science fiction" and said that the most interesting part of the series was the non-fiction sections about planet Earth, which show "the breadth of knowledge scientists have accumulated about our planet". Likewise, Emma Stefansky of Thrillist said the alien creatures were fun, but "it's the Earth-bound science that ends up being the most interesting part".

See also 

 Alien Planet, a 2005 Discovery Channel TV film with a similar premise
 Natural History of an Alien, a 1998 TV film, also by the Discovery Channel
 Extraterrestrial (Alien Worlds in the UK) a 2005 National Geographic documentary series

References

External links 
 
 
 "Exploring 'Alien Worlds' on Netflix" from the SETI Institute

English-language Netflix original programming
2020 British television series debuts
2020 British television series endings
British television documentaries
Documentary films about nature
Netflix original documentary television series
2020s British documentary television series
Speculative evolution
Astrobiology
Television series by Warner Bros. Television Studios
Television series about extraterrestrial life
Television series set on fictional planets